The first seeds Evelyn Dearman and Nancy Lyle defeated Louie Bickerton and Nell Hopman 6–3, 6–4 in the wholly replayed final, to win the women's doubles tennis title at the 1935 Australian Championships.

The original final encounter had to be ceased because of falling light. The score stood at set all: 6–3, 2–6.

Seeds

  Evelyn Dearman /  Nancy Lyle (champions)
  Thelma Coyne /  Dorothy Round (semifinals)
  Louie Bickerton /  Nell Hopman (final)
  Mall Molesworth /  Emily Hood Westacott (semifinals)

Draw

Draw

Notes

 Joan Hartigan, the original doubles partner for Miss Round, withdrew acting on medical advice. (See: reference #2).

References

External links
 Source for seedings

1935 in Australian tennis
1935 in women's tennis
1935 in Australian women's sport
Women's Doubles